Elise Schaap (born 21 September 1982) is a Dutch actress.

Career 
Elise Schaap acts in television series and films. In the popular television series Familie Kruys, she played a pregnant Romanian bride. Schaap played the girlfriend of a drug kingpin in the series Undercover, reprising her role in the 2021 film Ferry. It was announced in 2021 that Schaap would star in the first Dutch Netflix original comedy series. She also starred in the films My Father Is an Airplane (2021), Hotel Sinestra (2022) and Faithfully Yours (2022).

Personal life 

Schaap was born  in Papendrecht. Her family then moved to Rotterdam when she was six. From age 15, she worked in a tanning salon. She studied at the Academy of Theatre and Dance in Amsterdam and gave birth to a daughter in 2015.

Awards and recognition 

Schaap won Best Actress at Monte-Carlo Television Festival (2011) for The Swing Girls (together with Andrea Osvárt and Lotte Verbeek). She was nominated for the 2014 Golden Calf for Best Supporting Role in Afscheid van de Maan. In 2021, she won the Televizier-Ster award for the third year in a row.

Filmography

Film

Television

References 

People from Papendrecht
21st-century Dutch actresses
People from Rotterdam
Living people
1982 births